Darren Paul Currie (born 29 November 1974) is an English former footballer who made over 600 appearances in The Football League. He is assistant head coach of Southend United.

Club career
Currie, who is the nephew of former Sheffield United, Leeds United and England footballer Tony Currie, began his career as a trainee at West Ham United in 1993 but did not play for the first team. He had a loan spell at Leyton Orient before joining Shrewsbury Town in February 1996 for a transfer fee of £70,000, for whom he made over 70 league and cup appearances in two seasons.

He was released by Shrewsbury in March 1998 and joined Plymouth Argyle until the end of the 1997–98 season. He then joined Barnet in summer 1998 and made over 140 league and cup appearances in three seasons. He was selected in the PFA Team of the Season for Division Three for two consecutive seasons but after Barnet were relegated to the Nationwide Conference at the end of the 2000–01 season, he left Barnet and joined Wycombe Wanderers for a transfer fee of £200,000. He left Wycombe by mutual consent at the end of the 2003–04 season after the club was relegated, having made over 140 appearances for the club.

Currie impressed Brighton manager Mark McGhee during pre-season trials in 2004 and was given a one-year contract, with McGee saying, "Darren has skills comparable with any player at this level." A few months later in December 2004, Currie joined Ipswich Town for a transfer fee of £250,000, which Brighton's financial position meant they could not turn down.

Currie made his debut for Ipswich in December 2004, scoring a goal and making another, as Ipswich beat Queens Park Rangers 4–2 away from home. He made 26 appearances for Ipswich in the 2004–05 season, as Ipswich reached the Football League Championship play-offs in May 2005.

Currie fell out of favour in the 2006–07 season, starting only six games before joining Coventry City on loan in November 2006 when Ipswich manager Jim Magilton could not guarantee him a place in the first-team. Currie had a two-week trial with the Major League Soccer club Los Angeles Galaxy early in 2007, for whom he made three substitute appearance, but was not offered a contract and returned to Ipswich.

He joined Derby County in March 2007 on a loan until the end of the season, which was extended until the end of May 2007 so he would be eligible for the 2006–07 season Football League Championship play-offs. He came on as a substitute in the second leg of the semi final against Southampton as his side won on penalties, but he did not feature in the final. Currie scored once during his spell at Derby, his goal coming on a 2–0 win over Leeds United on 6 May 2007.

Currie joined Luton Town on a free transfer from Ipswich in July 2007, signing a two-year contract, and scored on his debut against Hartlepool United in August 2007. He made 38 league and cup appearances in the 2007–08 season as Luton went into administration, suffered a ten-point penalty and were relegated.

Following Luton's relegation to League Two, Currie was one of several players to be offered a free transfer in May 2008, but declared that he would not leave the club until his demands were met. After negotiating terms with Brighton & Hove Albion, Currie turned them down and signed a three-year contract with League Two side Chesterfield.

On 23 November 2009, Currie joined League Two side Dagenham & Redbridge on a month's loan, making his debut on 24 November in a 0–0 away draw against AFC Bournemouth. He signed an 18-month contract with Dagenham on 19 January 2010. He made 16 appearances for the club in the 2010–11 season as they won promotion to League One. The next season, Currie made a further 22 league appearances, scoring once, as Dagenham were relegated straight back to League Two. He left the club in May 2011.

Currie went on trial with League Two side Southend United in July 2011, though was not offered a contract.

On 5 August 2011, Currie joined Conference South side Boreham Wood as both a player and the club's assistant manager.

On 11 November 2011, Currie joined Isthmian League Premier Division side Hendon in a playing capacity.

In October 2012, Currie rejoined Dagenham & Redbridge as a development coach. He also registered as a player, taking squad number 29 and appearing on the substitutes bench in a 3–2 loss at York City on 20 October 2012.
He appeared again on the bench for the 1–1 draw with Exeter City on 23 October 2012. Currie was promoted to assistant manager in February 2013, replacing Wayne Burnett who was promoted to manager following the departure of John Still to Luton Town. In December 2015, Currie and Warren Hackett became caretaker managers after Burnett was sacked. After two games in charge, Currie returned to his role as assistant after the return of Still.

Managerial career

Barnet
In June 2018, Currie returned to Barnet as assistant manager, once again as assistant to Still. Following Still's retirement on 28 December 2018, Currie took over as caretaker manager of the Bees. He was made permanent manager at Barnet on 23 January 2019. Currie's reign as Barnet manager got off to a good start following a 1–0 win away at Dagenham & Redbridge, a 1–1 draw at home to Boreham Wood and then beating Championship leaders Sheffield United in the FA Cup at Bramall Lane. They also took Brentford to a replay in the next round of the cup after a 3–3 draw at The Hive. Currie then led Barnet to the National League play-offs in his first full season in management, beating Yeovil Town 2–0 in the quarter-finals before losing by the same scoreline to Notts County in the semi-finals. On 12 August 2020, Currie and his assistant Junior Lewis left Barnet after failing to agree a new contract.

Sheffield United
Currie was appointed joint manager of the Sheffield United U23 team, along with Graham Coughlan, on 22 March 2021.

Southend United
On 20 October 2021, Currie joined National League side Southend United in the role of Assistant Head Coach to Kevin Maher.

Career statistics

Managerial statistics

Honours
Dagenham & Redbridge
Football League Two play-offs: 2010

Hendon
London Senior Cup: 2011–12

Individual
PFA Team of the Year: 1999–2000 Third Division, 2000–01 Third Division

References

External links
 
Hendon Stats at Greensnet

1974 births
Living people
Footballers from Hampstead
English footballers
Association football midfielders
Ipswich Town F.C. players
Brighton & Hove Albion F.C. players
Wycombe Wanderers F.C. players
Barnet F.C. players
Plymouth Argyle F.C. players
Leyton Orient F.C. players
Shrewsbury Town F.C. players
West Ham United F.C. players
Derby County F.C. players
Luton Town F.C. players
Coventry City F.C. players
Chesterfield F.C. players
Dagenham & Redbridge F.C. players
Boreham Wood F.C. players
Hendon F.C. players
Dagenham & Redbridge F.C. managers
Barnet F.C. non-playing staff
Barnet F.C. managers
Sheffield United F.C. non-playing staff
Southend United F.C. non-playing staff
English Football League players
National League (English football) players
Isthmian League players
English Football League managers
National League (English football) managers
English football managers
Association football coaches